Karen L. Valihura (born May 16, 1963) is an American lawyer who serves as a justice of the Delaware Supreme Court. She was appointed on June 6, 2014. Prior to her appointment, Valihura was a partner at Skadden, Arps, Slate, Meagher & Flom, LLP.

In October 2018, Justice Valihura dissented when the majority found that the business judgment rule protected a controlling shareholder even though he did not offer minority shareholder protections until after his initial squeeze-out bid.

References

1963 births
Living people
American women lawyers
Delaware lawyers
Justices of the Delaware Supreme Court
Skadden, Arps, Slate, Meagher & Flom people
University of Pennsylvania Law School alumni
Washington & Jefferson College alumni
21st-century American judges
21st-century American women judges